Business Environment Council (BEC) is a charitable non-profit-making organization established by the Hong Kong business sector to promote environmental sustainability in Hong Kong. BEC has four types of membership, including Council Member, Corporate Member, General Member and Affiliate Member, and most of them are listed companies in Hong Kong. Its current chairman is Mr Kevin O'Brien (Gammon Construction Limited). The Headquarters of BEC is located at 77 Tat Chee Ave, Kowloon Tong. The BEC Building attained the BEAM Plus Platinum Rating for Existing Buildings, the highest achievable green building rating in Hong Kong twice, in October 2017 and January 2023.

Major Programmes
 EnviroSeries Conference
Staged twice a year, EnviroSeries Conference aims to provide a cross-sector forum to discuss and address key issues related to Hong Kong's environmental sustainability.

 BEC Sustainable Consumption Programme
The programme is organised by BEC and funded by the Sustainable Development Fund, aiming to promote sustainable consumption and drive behavioural changes in Hong Kong.

Major Members

BEC has four types of membership: Council Member, Corporate Member, General Member and Affiliate Member, and which mainly come from leading listed, multinational or holding companies, large private or government-mandated corporations.
 Council Member

Airport Authority Hong Kong
Chinachem Agencies Ltd
CLP Power Hong Kong Limited
COSCO Shipping Ports Limited
Gammon Construction Limited
Green Island Cement Company Limited
Hang Lung Properties Limited
Hang Seng Bank Limited
Henderson Land Development Co., Ltd.
Hongkong Land Limited
Hysan Development Company Limited
Jardine Engineering Corporation (Representing the Jardine Matheson Group)

Kerry Properties Limited
KONE Elevator (HK) Limited
Kum Shing Group Limited
Link Asset Management Limited
Modern Terminals Limited
New World Development Company Limited
Orient Overseas Container Line Limited
PCCW Limited
Schneider Electric (Hong Kong) Limited
Shell Hong Kong Limited
Siemens Energy Limited
Siemens Limited

Sino Land Company Limited
Sun Hung Kai Properties Limited
Swire Pacific Limited
Swire Properties Limited
The Hong Kong and China Gas Company Limited
The Hong Kong Jockey Club
The Hongkong & Shanghai Banking Corporation Limited
The Hongkong Electric Company Limited
The Kowloon Motor Bus Company (1933) Limited
Wheelock & Company Limited

Organisational structure

Board of Directors for 2022 to 2024 
Chairman
Mr Kevin O'Brien (Gammon Construction Limited)

Immediate Past Chairman
Mr Richard Lancaster (CLP Power Hong Kong Limited)

Board Directors
Mr Peter Lee (Airport Authority Hong Kong)
Mr Donald Choi (Chinachem Agencies Limited)
Mr Ricky Ng (COSCO Shipping Ports Limited)
Ir Prof Daniel Cheng (Dunwell Enviro-Tech (Holdings) Limited)
Prof John Chai (Fook Tin Technologies Limited)
Mr Choi Ka Keung (Green Island Cement Company Limited)
Mr Randy Yu (Henderson Land Development Company Limited)
Mr Andy Yeung (Hongkong Land Limited)
Mr Noky Wong (Jardine Matheson Group)
Mrs Margaret Brooke (Professional Property Services Limited)
Ms Anne Yu (Shell Hong Kong Limited)
Mr. Erdal Elver (Siemens Limited)
Ms Susanna Wong (Sun Hung Kai Properties Limited)
Mr Mark Harper (Swire Pacific Limited)
Dr Raymond Yau (Swire Properties Limited)
Mr Huifeng Zhang (The Hongkong and Shanghai Banking Corporation Limited)
Mr Bill Ho (The Hongkong Electric Company, Limited)
Mr Charles Chiu (Wheelock and Company Limited)

Management Team 
Chief Executive Officer
Mr Simon Ng
Director – Finance
Mr Ivan Chan
Director – Operations
Ir C.F. Leung
Assistant Director – Communications
Ms Maggie Lam
Head – Policy & Research
Mr Merlin Lao
Head – ESG Strategy
Ms Vivian Yeung
Head – Human Resources & Administration
Ms Michelle Fung

References

Organizations established in 1992
Business organisations based in Hong Kong
1992 establishments in Hong Kong